A City Day is a type of annual festival celebrated in several cities in Russia and other countries of the former Soviet Union. The date varies from city to city, but it is often celebrated on a weekend. For example, Moscow City Day is typically celebrated on the first or second Saturday in September. City Day celebrations often include concerts, parades, fireworks, and other festive events.

List of selected City Days in Russia

Moscow - first or second Saturday in September 

Nizhny Novgorod - third Saturday in August 

Saint Petersburg - 27 May 

Samara - second Sunday in September

See also
Public holidays in Russia

References

Russian culture
Annual events in Russia
Observances in Russia